David M. Rosen (born January 22, 1930) is an American businessman and the co-founder of the Japanese video game company Sega. He retired from the company as Chairman in 1996.

Career

Rosen Enterprises, Ltd.
Rosen served in the United States Air Force from 1948 to 1952.  He was primarily in Japan and the Far East during the Korean War, and remained there after his service. In 1954 Rosen started Rosen Enterprises, Inc., which focused on selling art created in Japan to the American market, and photo studios for Japanese identification cards. The photo business was called Photorama and Rosen established studios in hundreds of locations all over Japan.

In 1957, Rosen Enterprises, Ltd. shifted its focus and pioneered the importation and operation of coin-op amusement machines popular in the United States, to Japan to meet the growing leisure market. Rosen leveraged his existing business relationships and locations of his Photorama photo studios to roll out the amusement machines.

Sega Enterprises, Ltd.
In 1965, Rosen Enterprises, Ltd. Merged with Nihon Goraku Bussan, Ltd. (aka Service Games). Nihon Goraku Bussan, Ltd. used the brand name Sega (the name originates from SErvice GAmes Japan) for their jukeboxes and slot machines which were located on United States Military bases for amusement purposes. After the merger of the two companies, Sega Enterprises Ltd. was established and Rosen became Chairman, Chief Executive Officer and President of the resulting company.

Rosen co-founded the Japan Amusement Association in 1967 and was elected as Chairman.

Periscope

In 1966, under Rosen's direction, Sega Enterprises Ltd., created its first original game, called Periscope, which led to the introduction of 25¢ play in the United States and began Sega's export business.

Gulf+Western Industries, Inc.
After meeting with Charles Bluhdorn in 1969, Rosen and partners agreed to sell Sega Enterprises Ltd. to the conglomerate Gulf+Western Industries, Inc., although Rosen remained CEO of the Sega division. In the early 1970s Sega was made a subsidiary of Paramount Pictures Corporation, which was also owned by Gulf+Western. During this period Barry Diller and Michael Eisner, both at Paramount joined Rosen on the Board of Sega and Rosen joined the Board at Paramount.

In 1978, Sega Enterprises acquired a distribution company, Essco Tdg., that was founded by Hayao Nakayama and an arcade game manufacturer, Gremlin Industries.

After the passing of Charles Bluhdorn, Gulf+Western wanted to sell off manufacturing assets, including Sega. Consequently, Sega's United States assets were sold to Bally Manufacturing Corporation.

Sega, Ltd.
Having already moved his family to Los Angeles and not wanting to return to Japan full-time, Rosen declined the opportunity of solely purchasing the Japanese assets of Sega. In March 1984, Rosen and Hayao Nakayama put together a buyout group led by Isao Okawa and purchased Sega's Japanese assets. Okawa became Chairman and Nakayama became President of Sega Ltd. This allowed Rosen to remain in the states while Nakayama was charged with the day-to-day operations of Sega's headquarters in Japan.

Rosen agreed to set up Sega of America and oversee the US & overseas operations, and he became Chairman of Sega of America which was headquartered in Los Angeles. Rosen remained a Director of Sega (Japan) until 1996, and at that time he resigned from both Sega (Japan) and Sega of America.

Rosen is currently retired and living in Los Angeles.

Personal life
Rosen was born in Brooklyn, New York, the son of Fay (née Sachs) and Samuel Rosen. He married Masako Fujisaki in 1954, and adopted a daughter, Lisa. Rosen is Jewish.

References

External links
 "8 Interesting Facts About Gaming's Greatest Companies" - Sega Was Founded By Americans
  "The Meteoric Rise and Fall of Sega"  by Eddy Wu
 "WIRED, The Next Level: Sega's Plans for World Domination"  Dec 1993
 SegaRetro Periscope Game

Living people
1930 births
United States Air Force personnel of the Korean War
American businesspeople
Jewish American military personnel
Sega people
Video game businesspeople
21st-century American Jews